The 1976 United States presidential election in Nevada took place on November 2, 1976, as part of the 1976 United States presidential election. Voters chose three representatives, or electors, to the Electoral College, who voted for president and vice president.

Nevada was coming off a landslide win by incumbent Mike O'Callaghan in the 1974 gubernatorial election over a severely divided opposition and anger over the Watergate scandal. However, veteran Democratic Senator Alan Bible, who had survived Richard Nixon’s 1968 victory, retired and was replaced by Republican Paul Laxalt who won a narrow victory at the same time the GOP were suffering landslide losses in other races.

This presidential election saw Nevada hold its first ever presidential primary, won by California Governor Jerry Brown, who had only entered the primaries two weeks beforehand after most were already conducted.

Senator Paul Laxalt, who had supported Ford's rival Ronald Reagan in the Republican primaries earlier in 1976, nonetheless campaigned vigorously for Ford once he won the GOP nomination. Consequently, despite the state having not voted against a winning Democratic nominee since 1892 and not for a losing Republican nominee since James G. Blaine in 1884, early October polls gave the state provisionally to Ford, with the lack of familiarity with Southern Evangelical Carter being viewed as a critical factor. Two days before Nevada's voters were to enter the polls Ford remained a slight favorite.

Nevada was won by incumbent President Gerald Ford (R–Michigan), with 50.17% of the popular vote, against Jimmy Carter (D–Georgia), with 45.81% of the popular vote. None of the third-party candidates amounted to a significant portion of the vote, as 2.53% of the voters either wrote-in another candidate or selected “no preference”.

Nevada has generally been a bellwether state since the early 20th century, and this election marked the first time since 1908 whereby Nevada was carried by the losing presidential candidate. Nevada would vote for the winning candidate in each election afterward except 2016. , this is the only election since 1892 in which a Democrat has won the White House without carrying Nevada, as well as the last time that Nye County, Storey County, and Esmeralda County voted for a Democratic Presidential candidate. This also marks the last time that Nevada voted for a candidate that lost both the electoral college and the popular vote.

Results

Results by county

See also
United States presidential elections in Nevada

Notes

References

Nevada
1976
1976 Nevada elections
1976 in Nevada